Shirali Farzali oghlu Muslumov, also spelled as Muslimov (pronounced ; ; allegedly March 26, 1805? – September 2, 1973) was an Azerbaijani shepherd of Talysh ethnicity from the village of Barzavu in the Lerik District of Azerbaijan, a mountainous area near the Iranian border. He claimed to be the oldest person who ever lived when he died on September 2, 1973, at the alleged age of 168. Shirali Muslumov was married 3 times and had 23 children. In 1966, the studio Azerbaijanfilm shot a documentary film about him, Shirali descended from the mountain. He became the father of his daughter when he was 136 years old. He was included in the Guinness Book of Records for longevity.

Life
According to legend, Muslumov worked hard every day, for up to 168 years, did not smoke or drink, but ate fruits, vegetables, wholemeal bread, chicken broth, low-fat cheese, and yogurt. He had several wives throughout his lifetime. Muslumov became ill with pneumonia between 1972 and 1973, but survived only to die later in 1973.

Muslumov's story was picked up in 1973 by National Geographic Magazine, which told that on the occasion he still rode horseback and tended an orchard planted in the 1870s. National Geographic later recanted on the claim. The same story was told by the Guinness Book of World Records, stated as unconfirmed along with other similar claims.  The 1974 Guinness noted that medical examinations revealed that the men with these extraordinary age claims typically had the physiology of men in their nineties. It also stated that these age claims most likely resulted from son–father and even son–grandfather impersonations in order to avoid the Czarist draft.

His marital status was also controversial. According to National Geographic, he had a 120-year-old wife whom he had married 102 years earlier. However, according to his obituary, published by  Time magazine, when Shirali Muslumov was 136 years old, he married 57-year-old Khatum-Khanum (1884–1988).

The only evidence in favor of Muslumov's age claim is an official passport that listed his birthdate. Muslumov had no known birth certificate.

Fame
The case of Muslumov became known in 1963, when a young photojournalist of TASS, Kalman Kaspiev, went to Barzavu to interview the centenarian. The story was picked up by the Soviet press, by National Geographic, and by the Danone company, which for promotional reasons suggested that the longevity of Muslumov was linked to a diet of dairy, and yogurt in particular. This interest changed the life of the small Azerbaijani village, which was connected to the electricity grid and started receiving radio and television broadcasts.

In the 1970s, Westerners were made aware of these extreme claims of longevity in Azerbaijan and elsewhere in the Caucasus region when a U.S. Danone yogurt commercial invoked some of these people to suggest that the secret of their long lives lay in the frequent consumption of yogurt. However, the idea that peoples of the Caucasus region live longer because of eating yogurt is a myth not supported by any factual evidence. Yoghurt is rarely eaten in the Caucasus mountain region.

See also
Longevity myths
Longevity claims

References

External links
A lesson in longevity
Sept. 17, 1973 TIME Magazine obituary (bottom of page)
"Azerbaijan's Legendary Centenarian", a 1996 article detailing the story behind Muslimov's claims of incredible longevity
Centenarians in Azerbaijan

Longevity myths
Shepherds
Talysh people
Talysh people
1805 births
1973 deaths